Mantophryne louisiadensis is a species of frog in the family Microhylidae. It is endemic to Rossel Island, a part of the Louisiade Archipelago in the Milne Bay Province of Papua New Guinea. Common name Louisiade archipelago frog has been proposed for this species. Mantophryne axanthogaster from the neighboring Sudest Island was formerly included in it.

Description
Adult males measure  and adult females  in snout–vent length. The head is relatively wide. The dorsum is uniform brown or gray. The ventral side is bright yellow or orange-yellow.

Habitat and conservation
Mantophryne louisiadensis occurs in lowland rainforest and cloud forest at elevations below . There are no recent observations of this species, but it does not appear to be facing major threats. Suitable habitat appears to be plentiful as Rossel Island is very largely covered by primary or slightly disturbed rainforest and this species ranges across the entire altitudinal range of the island.  It is not known to occur in any protected area.

Notes

References

louisiadensis
Amphibians of Papua New Guinea
Endemic fauna of Papua New Guinea
Taxa named by Hampton Wildman Parker
Amphibians described in 1934
Taxonomy articles created by Polbot